The Light of a Distant Star is a 1964 Soviet romance film directed by Ivan Pyryev.

Plot 
The film is about lovers who are separated by war. Some time after the end of the war, the main character goes to look for his girlfriend after seeing her photo in a single magazine.

Cast 
 Lionella Pyryeva as Olga Mironova (as L. Pyryeva)
 Nikolai Alekseyev as Vladimir Zavyalov
 Aleksey Batalov as Lukashov
 Vladimir Korenev as Viktor - Zavyalov's nephew
 Vera Mayorova as Liza
 Sofiya Pilyavskaya as Xenia Petrovna
 Andrei Abrikosov as General Osokin
 Olga Vikladt as Nina Pavlovna (as Olga Vikland)
 Aleftina Konstantinova as Valya (as Alevtina Konstantinova)
 Yevgeny Vesnik as Colonel

References

External links 
 

1964 films
1960s Russian-language films
Soviet romance films
1960s romance films
Soviet black-and-white films